Charles Hayden (July 8, 1870 – January 8, 1937) was an American banker, businessman, financier and philanthropist. He was the senior partner of Hayden, Stone & Co. and his influence was such that James W. Gerard listed him among those "who are too busy to hold political office, but determine who shall." Noted contributions bearing his name include the Hayden Planetarium in New York, the Charles Hayden Planetarium at Boston's Museum of Science, and the Charles Hayden Foundation. Instrumental in the financing of Arizona copper mines and smelters, the smelting community of Hayden, Arizona, was named for him.

Background
Hayden was born in Boston, Massachusetts, to Josiah Willard Hayden and Emma A. (Tirrill) Hayden. His father was a shoe and leather merchant and he was educated in the public schools before enrolling at the Massachusetts Institute of Technology. Hayden studied mining investment and graduated in 1890. Following graduation, he traveled for a year before taking a position as clerk with the Boston bank of Clark, Ward, & Co.

Hayden was a bachelor his entire life and lived at the Savoy-Plaza Hotel in Manhattan. His hobbies included steeplechase and bridge.

Career
In 1892, Hayden joined with fellow Clark, Ward, & Co. clerk Galen L. Stone to open Hayden, Stone & Co. Hayden gained a reputation for quick decisions and mastery of the brokerage business. Foreseeing the needs of electrification, Hayden made his fortune by investing in copper mining. The new investment firm prospered, expanding from its Boston base to open a New York City branch in 1906.

In addition to his brokerage firm, Hayden was involved in other business operations. During his lifetime he was appointed director to 89 companies, and held 58 directorships at the time of his death.

Philanthropy
Hayden was involved with philanthropy most of his life. During the First World War, he donated US$100,000 per year to the American Red Cross. He later became interested in helping youth and in 1926 was revealed to have anonymously donated US$100,000 to establish an uptown New York City branch of the Boys Club. This was followed in 1933 when, at the request of President Franklin D. Roosevelt, Hayden chaired the Boy Scout Maintenance Fund for the Boy Scouts of America.

In addition to youth, Hayden routinely donated to aid the poor. In 1934, he donated US$150,000 to New York's American Museum of Natural History for creation of a planetarium which was named after him. This was followed the next year when he headed a committee which raised $9,440,000 to save New York's charitable hospitals.

Charles Hayden Foundation

Hayden's largest philanthropic effort came following his death on January 8, 1937, when his will directed roughly US$50,000,000 ($ in today's dollars) from his estate be used to create a foundation to advance the education and "moral, mental, and physical well-being" of boys and young men. The Charles Hayden Foundation makes grants of between US$10,000,000 and US$20,000,000 annually to support programs for children in the Boston and New York metropolitan areas. The Foundation has also funded the construction of the Charles Hayden Library of humanities and science at Hayden's alma mater MIT, and dormitories named Hayden Hall at Stevens Institute of Technology in Hoboken, New Jersey, and the New York University School of Law in New York City.

References

1870 births
1937 deaths
American bankers
American investors
American financiers
Burials at Mount Auburn Cemetery
Massachusetts Institute of Technology alumni
Businesspeople from Boston
Philanthropists from Massachusetts
Stock and commodity market managers